The 1971–72 season was Fussball Club Basel 1893's 78th season in their existence. It was their 26th consecutive season in the top flight of Swiss football after their promotion the season 1945–46. They played their home games in the St. Jakob Stadium.  The club's chairman was Félix Musfeld for the second year in a row.

Overview

Pre-season
Helmut Benthaus was player-manager for the seventh consecutive season. Towards the end of his playing career Benthaus stood on the side line as team manager and he only substituted himself into the game if it was not running as he wanted it. In this season Benthaus substituted himself in during just one single game. This being the second last home match of the season on 27 May against Luzern Benthaus retired from playing in at the end of the season aged 36. He made only minor adjustments to his squad at the beginning of the season, Rolf Blättler joined from Lugano, René Hasler from Zürich and youngster Ottmar Hitzfeld was fetched from FV Lörrach on the lower German league. Edoardo Manzoni left the squad and returned to Xamax because his loan had come to an end.

Domestic league
14 teams contested in the 1971–72 Nationalliga A. These were the top 12 teams from the previous 1970–71 season and the two newly promoted teams St. Gallen and Grenchen. The championship was played in a double round robin. The champions would qualify for the 1972–73 European Cup and the last two teams in the table at the end of the season were to be relegated. Basel remained undefeated in the league during the first 24 rounds. Of their 26 league games Basel won 18, drawing seven, losing just once, scoring 66 goals conceding 28. Basel won the championship four points ahead of Zürich and five points ahead of the Grasshoppers. Ottmar Hitzfeld was Basel's top league goal scorer with 16 league goals, Walter Balmer second with 14 league goals and Karl Odermatt third best with 9 goals. The average attendance at the league matches was 18'769 spectators, the highest number of spectators came to the stadium for the last game of the season against Zürich

Swiss Cup
For Basel the Swiss Cup started in the round of 32 on 24 October 1971 with a 3–1 home win against Monthey. On 21 November in the round of 16 Basel played away from home against La Chaux-de-Fonds. The match resulted with a 3–0 success. The quarter-final was played on 12 March 1972 in Zürich against Grasshopper-Club. The tie ended with a 1–1 draw and this meant a replay three days later. Basel won the replay 3–2 and continued onto the semi-finals against BSC Young Boys. In the Wankdorf Stadium on 3 April Karl Odermatt and Walter Balmer each scored a goal to give Basel a 2–0 victory. The final was played on 22 May 1970 also in the Wankdorf Stadium but Basel were defeated 0–1 by Zürich through a goal by Jeandupeux in extra time of the first half.

UEFA and Cup of the Alps
The 1971–72 UEFA Cup was the inaugural year of the UEFA Cup (now known as the UEFA Europa League), which effectively replaced the Inter-Cities Fairs Cup. In the first round Basel were drawn against Real Madrid. The first leg, which played on 15 September 1971 in the St. Jakob Stadium attracted 32'059 spectators but ended for Basel with a 1–2 defeat. Madrid won thanks to goals from Francisco Aguilar and Santillana, who turned the result around after the Swiss scored the opener through René Hasler. The return leg on 29 September in Santiago Bernabéu Stadium was watched by 61'861 spectators and also ended with the same result. The same two Spanish international players were the heroes once again, each scoring a goal, to ensure Real Madrid their passage to the next round.

In the 1971 Cup of the Alps there were four participants from Switzerland and four from Italy. These being Hellas Verona, Lazio, Sampdoria and Varese. The four from Switzerland were Lugano, Lausanne Sports, Winterthur and Basel. Two teams from each country were drawn into each of the two groups. Within the group each team played the two clubs of the other country twice, but did not play compatriots. The Italians and the Swiss each formed their own league table and the winners from each country then matched themselves in the final. Basel won the Swiss Group and qualified for the final, however they were defeated by Lazio 1–3. The final was played in St. Jakob Stadium, Basel.

Players 

 

 
 
 
 

 

 
 
 

 

 
 
 
 

 
 

 
 

Players who left the squad

Results 
Legend

Friendly matches

Pre-season

Winter break

Nationalliga

League matches

League standings

Swiss Cup

UEFA Cup

First round

Real Madrid won 4–2 on aggregate.

Cup of the Alps

Matches

Final Table Switzerland

Final 
The Final was played in St. Jakob Stadium, Basel, between the winner of the Italien and the winner of the Swiss groups.

See also
 History of FC Basel
 List of FC Basel players
 List of FC Basel seasons

References

Notes

Sources 
 Rotblau: Jahrbuch Saison 2015/2016. Publisher: FC Basel Marketing AG. 
 Die ersten 125 Jahre. Publisher: Josef Zindel im Friedrich Reinhardt Verlag, Basel. 
 FCB team 1971–72 at fcb-archiv.ch
 Switzerland 1971–72 at RSSSF

External links
 FC Basel official site

FC Basel seasons
Basel
1971-72